Instinct is a two-part drama serial which premièred on ITV on 26 February 2007. It was created and written by Lizzie Mickery, and produced by Tightrope Pictures for ITV. The serial follows Detective Chief Inspector Thomas Flynn, played by Anthony Flanagan, as he hunts a serial killer in the Lancashire Pennines, while dealing with a troubled personal life.

Overview
Mickery, who had previously written the first three series of the similarly themed Messiah, described Instinct as a character-driven whodunit, which placed the emotional lives of the characters at the forefront of the drama. In creating the lead character of Thomas Flynn, she wanted to explore "why sometimes somebody who is a good detective is fallible as a man." Flynn is a thirtysomething, contemporary character who is not "the usual middle-aged detective, disillusioned and world weary with a broken marriage and a love of scotch." Flynn's defining characteristics are that he relishes his work, is emotionally detached and has acute powers of observation.

Flanagan described the case investigated by Flynn as a rites of passage. He said: "Events in his personal life - he discovers he has a half-sister and that throws him totally - begin to impinge on the investigation. That makes it far more interesting than any of the stuff concerned with the procedural side of police work."

Mickery and Flanagan both expressed hopes that Instinct would return, with Flanagan stating that the end of the second episode felt like a beginning for his character.  ITV did not recommission it, and no further episodes were made.

Setting
Mickery opted to set Instinct away from the anonymity of a large city, choosing the Lancashire Pennines to provide an atmospheric backdrop to the plot. She described the Pennines as "an extraordinary place. It has that sense of humanity clinging on to nature ... it's beautiful but daunting."

Instinct was filmed in and around the Rossendale Valley. Some scenes were shot on location in Bacup, where the town library was transformed into a police station, and a police chase was filmed through the gardens of local houses.

Cast and characters
 Anthony Flanagan as DCI Thomas Flynn: The protagonist, an introverted detective who has risen speedily through the ranks thanks to his incisive mind and observational skills. He is prone to making instinctive leaps of intuition. The emotional detachment that makes him so brilliant a detective is threatened when he is confronted with his past in the form of his comatose estranged father, and meets his half-sister, Milly, for the first time.
 Tom Ward as Ian Stanford: Stanford comes under police scrutiny after the murder of his wife, Megan. Shortly after her death he is reunited with the son he never knew he had, Jake, the result of a sperm donation nineteen years before. His newly discovered family ties place him in symmetry to Thomas Flynn, with whom he forms a tacit friendship as the investigation progresses.
 Christine Bottomley as Milly: Flynn's half-sister. Vivacious and outspoken, she is a single mother to a young son, Sid.
 Jaye Griffiths as DS Shakia Barton: Flynn's right-hand woman.
 Fiona Glascott as DC Ali Peters: A junior member of Flynn's team.
 Paul Ritter as DC Daniel Yelland: A junior member of Flynn's team.
 Claire Hackett as Sue Richards: The mother of Ian Stanford's son, Jake.
 Michael Hodgson as Phil Richards: The husband of Sue Richards who has brought up her son, Jake, as his own.
 Liam Boyle as Jake Richards: The biological son of Ian Stanford and Sue Richards.

Episode list

Awards
Instinct won Best Single Drama or Drama Serial at the Royal Television Society North West Awards 2007.

Reception
Instinct made its debut on ITV1 with ratings of 6.26 million. Viewing figures for the second and final episode fell to 4.42 million.

It received mixed reviews from critics; Jane Simon, writing for The Mirror, said: "To really succeed as a TV detective you've got to have a gimmick. DCI Thomas Flynn's is instinct - but you probably could have worked that out from the title." She added: "While Flynn might be able to glance at a bloody crime scene and leap to some helpful conclusions, audiences might find this dark new drama a little bewildering." James Walton, reviewing the first episode for The Daily Telegraph, commented that the drama had been "bogged down" by its emphasis on the psychological, adding that the "solemn pondering of fathers and sons has so far got in the way of the thrills – but without being fresh, gripping or indeed believable enough to justify its position at centre stage." Digital Spy'''s Dek Hogan described the plot as "unnecessarily convoluted", and said the serial was "downbeat, one paced and frankly monotonous ... quite why it took three hours to tell a tale that [could] easily have been told far more economically in one is a far bigger mystery than the one this unmemorable bunch of coppers were trying to solve."

Harry Venning, writing for The Stage, considered Instinct a "deliciously gruesome, coldly efficient murder mystery." The Guardian'''s Gareth McLean believed the character of DCI Flynn was compelling and had "real potential", and praised the serial for both its look and script. Writing after the decision not to recommission it was taken, he described it as having "the makings of a long-running, iconic detective show with the obligatory troubled, idiosyncratic protagonist."

References

External links
 

2000s British drama television series
2007 British television series debuts
2007 British television series endings
2000s British crime television series
ITV television dramas
2000s British television miniseries
English-language television shows
Television shows set in West Yorkshire